Husung Hardware is a building that was constructed in 1936 in Alamosa, Colorado with a terracotta facade and stylized ornamentation. The two-story brick building possesses the distinctive characteristics of Art Deco, a style not well represented in Alamosa County or in other small towns across the state. The well-preserved building is considered to be one of the best small town expressions of Art Deco in the state. On January 28, 2000, it was listed on the National Register of Historic Places.

References

Buildings and structures in Alamosa, Colorado
Commercial buildings completed in 1936
National Register of Historic Places in Alamosa County, Colorado